The 22223/22224 Mumbai CSMT - Sainagar Shirdi Vande Bharat Express is India's 10th Vande Bharat Express train, running across the state of Maharashtra.

Overview 
This train is operated by Indian Railways, connecting Mumbai CSMT, Dadar Ctrl, Thane, Nashik Road and Sainagar Shirdi Terminus. It is currently operated with train numbers 22223/22224 on 6 days a week basis.

Rakes 
It is the eighth second-generation Vande Bharat Express train and will be designed and manufactured by the Integral Coach Factory (ICF) under the leadership of Sudhanshu Mani at Perambur, Chennai under the Make in India initiative.

Coach Composition 
The 22223/22224 Mumbai CSMT - Sainagar Shirdi Vande Bharat Express currently has 14 AC Chair Car and 2 Executive Chair Cars coaches.

The coaches in Aqua color indicate AC Chair Cars and the coaches in Pink color indicate AC Executive Chair Cars.

Service 
The 22223/22224 Mumbai CSMT - Sainagar Shirdi Vande Bharat Express will currently operate 6 days a week, covering a distance of 339 km (211 mi) in a travel time of 5 hrs 20 mins with average speed of 64 km/hr. The Maximum Permissible Speed (MPS) given is 110 km/hr.

Schedule 
The schedule of this 22223/22224 Mumbai CSMT - Sainagar Shirdi Vande Bharat Express is given below:-

See also 
 Vande Bharat Express
 Tejas Express
 Gatimaan Express
 Mumbai CSMT Terminus
 Sainagar Shirdi Terminus

References 

Vande Bharat Express trains
Named passenger trains of India
Higher-speed rail
Express trains in India
 
Transport in Mumbai
Rail transport in Mumbai
Transport in Shirdi